Pygela was a town of ancient Lycia, which per the Stadiasmus Patarensis was 60 stadia from Corydala.
 
Its site is unlocated, but is conjectured to be in the upper watershed of the Alakır River.

References

Populated places in ancient Lycia
Former populated places in Turkey
Lost ancient cities and towns